Flowing Free Forever is the sixth album by American singer-songwriter Michael Martin Murphey. The album establishes Murphey's love of wide open spaces and his "desire to let his soul roam freely." The album was not as commercially successful as a few of his earlier releases, but "Murphey's visions and persona remain intact." The album contains the song "Cherokee Fiddle", which was later recorded by Johnny Lee for the film soundtrack for Urban Cowboy. Flowing Free Forever peaked at number 130 on the Billboard 200.

Track listing
 "Flowing Free Forever" (Murphey, Murphey) – 4:15
 "North Wind and a New Moon" (Murphey, Murphey) – 3:55
 "Cherokee Fiddle" (Murphey) – 3:34
 "See How All the Horses Come Dancing" (Murphey) – 4:36
 "Yellow House" (Broussard) – 5:15
 "Changing Woman" (Murphey, McKinney) – 4:05
 "High Country Caravan" (Fromholtz) – 4:38
 "Running Wide Open" (Murphey) – 3:26
 "Our Lady of " (Murphey, Weisberg) – 2:28
 "Wandering Minstrel" (Murphey) – 5:25

Credits
Music
 Michael Martin Murphey – vocals, guitar, piano, harmonica, percussion, producer
 Sam Broussard – guitar, background vocals
 John McEuen – banjo, guitar, mandolin, fiddle
 Peter Maunu – electric guitar
 John Macy – steel guitar
 Jack Murphy – piano, synthesizer
 James Murphy – keyboards, synthesizer
 David Luell – alto sax, tenor sax, baritone sax
 Ray Bonneville – harmonica
 Michael McKinney – bass, background vocals
 Harry Wilkinson – drums, percussion
 Victor Feldman – percussion
 Deborah McColl – background vocals
 Steven Fromholz – background vocals

Production
 Jeff Guercio – producer

References

External links
 Michael Martin Murphey's Official Website

1976 albums
Michael Martin Murphey albums